Dziatlava or Dyatlovo is a town in Grodno Region, Belarus, and the administrative center of Dzyatlava District. The population was 7,700 in 2016.

History

Grand Duchy of Lithuania 
Zietela was first referenced in documents from 1498 when it was granted by the King of Poland John I Albert to Prince Konstanty Ostrogski, who later built a wooden castle there.

17th century 
In the 17th century, Zietela was owned by Lew Sapieha, who ordered a Catholic church to be erected on the main city square. The church was consecrated in 1646, renovated after a fire in 1743 and still stands.

18th century 
During the Great Northern War of the anti-Swedish alliance, Peter I of Russia visited Zietela and stayed there for a week in January 1708. In the 18th century, the town was owned by Stanisław Sołtyk, who built a Baroque residence there in 1751. After the partitions of Poland, until the aftermath of World War I, the town was within the Russian Empire, in the Grodno Governorate, district of Slonim.

20th century 
Between World War I and World War II, Zdzięcioł (now Dziatlava) belonged to the Second Polish Republic. It was the seat of Gmina Zdzięcioł in Nowogródek Voivodeship. The population was composed predominantly of Polish Jews. The Soviet forces invaded eastern Poland on September 17, 1939, and stationed in the Voivodeship area until the outbreak of their own war with Germany in June 1941. After the Soviet rapid retreat, and several months of Nazi ad hoc persecution, on February 22, 1942 the new German authorities officially created Zdzięcioł Ghetto.

During the Holocaust, about 3,000–5,000 Jews were killed near the town during the Dzyatlava massacre of 1942 by a German death squad aided by the Lithuanian and the Belarusian Auxiliary Police battalions. The old Jewish cemetery is considered a minor landmark.

Lithuanian heritage 

Being 80 kilometres south of present-day Lithuania, Zietela's environs had been known by linguists as the outermost indigenous Lithuanian speaking "island" apart from the contiguous Lithuanian language territory. The Lithuanian speakers spoke a unique dialect, known as the "Zietela dialect"; it has been speculated that the ancestors of its speakers might have been Lithuanized Jotvingians. It drew the attention by many prominent linguists, such as Christian Schweigaard Stang, Vladimir Toporov, Kazimieras Būga and Juozas Balčikonis. In 1886, 1,156 people in nearby villages declared themselves Lithuanians, however, the real number might have been much greater. At present the Lithuanian population is virtually extinct.

People 
 Ivan Karizna, cellist
 Jacob ben Wolf Kranz of Dubno, the "Dubner maggid" (1741–1804)
 Yisrael Meir Kagan (Chofetz Chayim), 1839–1933
 Zvi Yosef Resnick, rabbi and rosh yeshivah (1841–1912)
 Mnachem Risikoff, rabbi and scholar (1866–1960), born in Dzyatlava
 Baruch Sorotzkin (1917-1979)
 Tamara Lazakovich, European All-Around Co-Champion (1971) and Olympic medalist (1972) in gymnastics

See also 
 Dzyatlava Ghetto
 Dzyatlava massacre

References

External links 

 Info of Dziatłava
 Photos on Radzima.org
 (in Russian) Dyatlovo information portal
 ארגון יוצאי ז'טל ודורות ההמשך
 
 Dyatlovo old website

 
Towns in Belarus
Populated places in Grodno Region
Nowogródek Voivodeship (1507–1795)
Slonimsky Uyezd
Nowogródek Voivodeship (1919–1939)
Shtetls
Holocaust locations in Belarus
Dzyatlava District